Albone is an Italian surname. Notable people with this surname include:

 Charlie Albone, an Australian landscape designer and television presenter
 Dan Albone, an English inventor, manufacturer and cyclist

See also 

 Albon (surname)
 Albone (disambiguation)

Italian-language surnames